The Dublin Docklands Development Authority (DDDA) was created by the Dublin Docklands Development Authority Act 1997 to lead a major project of physical, social and economic regeneration in the East side of Dublin, Ireland, along both banks of the River Liffey. On 31 May 2012 the Irish government announced its intention to wind up the Authority. The full dissolution was due to take place in May 2014 with a plan to phase the organisation into the Docklands Consultative Forum. At the time, this plan was postponed due to disengagement of the DDDA leading up to the dissolution date. The Authority was officially dissolved on 1 March 2016.

History
The stated mission of the DDDA was to 'develop the Dublin Docklands into a world-class city quarter paragon of sustainable inner city regeneration – one in which the whole community enjoys the highest standards of access to education, employment, housing and social amenity and which delivers a major contribution to the social and economic prosperity of Dublin and the whole of Ireland'.

The Authority was due to work until 2012 on the development of the area and manage the investment of €7bn from both public and private sources.

The broad remit of The Authority included social regeneration which in practical terms resulted in the building of over 11,000 new homes. They also managed several events each year including the Docklands Fun Run which started from Grand Canal Dock.

Among the more famous projects it was responsible for overseeing were the Spencer Dock development, the Point Village (which ran into financial difficulties and was taken over by NAMA), and the proposed U2 Tower (which was abandoned).

Glass Bottle Plant losses
In November 2006, a consortium headed by property developer Bernard McNamara, and including financier Derek Quinlan and the Dublin Docklands Development Authority paid €412m for the 25 acres former Irish Glass Bottle site in Ringsend in Dublin. However the development never went ahead and the land – which ultimately cost €431 million when the price of acquisition, stamp duty and other costs is included – was valued in 2011 at €45 million. A special report on the DDDA by the Comptroller and Auditor General found that the authority failed to get an independent valuation of the site before committing to the deal, a move which ultimately ended up costing the authority €52 million.

Winding up
On 31 May 2012 the Irish government announced its intention to wind up the Dublin Docklands Development Authority. The decision followed the publication of a special report on the DDDA by the Comptroller and Auditor General, which contained "damning findings about the authority's conduct". The Minister for Environment Phil Hogan, who was responsible for the DDDA, said the Government remained fully committed to the continued regeneration of the Dublin Docklands. However he said that taking account of several reports published about the DDDA, keeping the authority on a standalone basis was no longer viable, financially or otherwise. The authority was to remain in place for a transitional period of up to 18 months under a new board chaired by the then Dublin city manager John Tierney, later chief executive of Irish Water. In November 2013 Phil Hogan announced that he had asked the board to remain in place for an indefinite period. The authority's planning functions had already been transferred to the city council.

In December 2013 the Dáil Committee of Public Accounts (PAC) called Paul Maloney (CEO of the DDDA from 2005 to 2009) before it to discuss the developments at the DDDA. The PAC chairman, John McGuinness, stated that the committee wished to discuss Maloney's role in the risk assessment/risks which were identified and advised to the Board by the Executive; his involvement in the selection of Bernard McNamara as a joint venture partner; his involvement in deciding on the tender bid amount and his involvement in allowing Bernard McNamara latitude to increase the bid based on this expertise, and why Mr Maloney submitted a letter to the Department of the Environment citing a valuation of €220 million when, in reality, the Board was considering a bid of almost double that amount.

On 10 June 2014 the Dublin Business Forum decided that the dissolution plan would be postponed due to disengagement of the DDDA leading up to the planned dissolution date of May 2014. There were three main issues: 
1) Failure to acknowledge enterprise as the key driver of Docklands success
2) Unclear terms of reference for the membership of the Docklands Consultative Forum 
3) Lack of transparency in the transfer the remaining cash and related assets

The Authority was fully dissolved on 1 March 2016.

See also

 Post-2008 Irish economic downturn
 Docklands Strategic Development Zone
 Dublin Docklands
 Spencer Dock
 Point Village
 Grand Canal Dock
 Ringsend

References

External links
 

Economy of Dublin (city)
Defunct government agencies of Ireland
Dublin Docklands
Investment promotion agencies
1997 establishments in Ireland
2016 disestablishments in Ireland
Waterfront redevelopment organizations